Bjarni Sveinbjörnsson (born 18 February 1963) is a retired Icelandic footballer who played as a striker. He spent the majority of his playing career with Þór Akureyri, but also spent spells with ÍBV and Dalvík. Bjarni won one cap for the Iceland national football team, coming on as a substitute for Guðmundur Steinsson in the 1–0 win over the Faroe Islands on 12 July 1985. He also made three appearances for the Iceland U19 team.

References

Bjarni Sveinbjörnsson international appearances at ksi.is

1963 births
Living people
Bjarni Sveinbjornsson
Association football forwards
Bjarni Sveinbjornsson
Bjarni Sveinbjornsson
Bjarni Sveinbjornsson